Ongokea is a genus of flowering plants, with one species Ongokea gore (Boleko). In the APG IV system, the genus is placed in the family Olacaceae. Other sources place it in the segregate family Aptandraceae.

Its native range is Western Tropical Africa to Angola, and is notable for the seeds of its edible fruits containing an industrially-useful oil that can undergo explosive polymerization reactions at elevated temperatures. This oil is curious for being rich in diacetylenic and hydroxy-diacetylenic fatty acids, primarily isanic and bolekic acid - that is, instead of a typical single-bonded fatty acid backbone, these acids contain multiple (thermally unstable) triple bonds.

References

Olacaceae
Monotypic Santalales genera